The 2015 Marshall Thundering Herd football team represented Marshall University in the 2015 NCAA Division I FBS football season as members of the East Division of Conference USA. They were led by sixth-year head coach John "Doc" Holliday and played their home games at Joan C. Edwards Stadium in Huntington, West Virginia. They finished the season 10–3, 6–2 in C-USA play to finish in a tie for second place in the East Division. They were invited to the St. Petersburg Bowl where they defeated UConn.

Schedule
Marshall announced their 2015 football schedule on February 2, 2015. The 2015 schedule consisted of six home and away games in the regular season. The Thundering Herd hosted CUSA foes Florida International (FIU), North Texas, Old Dominion, and Southern Miss, and travelled to Charlotte, Florida Atlantic, Middle Tennessee, and Western Kentucky (WKU).

Marshall went undefeated at home but lost three road games, finishing the regular season with a 9-3 record and finishing third in the division. Marshall was invited to the St. Petersburg Bowl against the University of Connecticut which they won with a final score of 16-10.

Schedule source:

Game summaries

Purdue

Ohio

Norfolk State

Kent State

Old Dominion

Southern Miss

Florida Atlantic

North Texas

Charlotte

Middle Tennessee

Florida International

Western Kentucky

UConn (St. Petersburg Bowl)

References

Marshall
Marshall Thundering Herd football seasons
Gasparilla Bowl champion seasons
Marshall Thundering Herd football